Chitra Kulathummuriyil Soman (born 10 July 1983) was born in Kottayam, Kerala. Her father is from Kottayam  and her mother is from kanjirappally, Kerala. She is an Indian sprinter who specializes in the 400 metres. Soman finished seventh in 4 x 400 metres relay at the 2004 Summer Olympics, together with teammates Satti Geetha, K. M. Beenamol and Rajwinder Kaur. This team, only with Manjeet Kaur running instead of Geetha, had set a national record of 3:26.89 minutes in the heat. Soman also ran for the Indian team who won a silver medal at the 2006 Commonwealth Games. In 2007, Chitra Soman won gold medal in 400m race at Asian Grand Prix series held at Guwahati on 23 June 2007 and at Puen held on 27 June 2007. She also led Indian women 4 × 400 m relay team to Gold in Asian Athletics Championship held at Amman in July 2007. In 2008, Chitra again showed her class by leading another win for Indian women 4 × 400 m relay team in 3rd Asian Indoor Championship in Athletics held in Doha in Feb 2008.

Her personal best time in 400 m is 51.30 seconds, achieved in June 2004 in Chennai.she got married 2011 and he is from punjab.

See also
 List of Kerala Olympians

References

 

1983 births
Living people
Sportswomen from Kerala
Indian female sprinters
21st-century Indian women
21st-century Indian people
Olympic athletes of India
Athletes (track and field) at the 2004 Summer Olympics
Asian Games medalists in athletics (track and field)
Athletes (track and field) at the 2006 Asian Games
Athletes (track and field) at the 2006 Commonwealth Games
Athletes (track and field) at the 2010 Commonwealth Games
World Athletics Championships athletes for India
Malayali people
Recipients of the Arjuna Award
Commonwealth Games medallists in athletics
Commonwealth Games silver medallists for India
Asian Games gold medalists for India
Medalists at the 2006 Asian Games
Medallists at the 2006 Commonwealth Games
Medallists at the 2010 Commonwealth Games